Chepkirui, or Chepkurui, is a female name of Kalenjinn origin of Kenya meaning born at night. It may refer to:
Eunice Chepkirui (born 1984), Kenyan-born Bahraini long-distance runner 
Joyce Chepkirui (born 1988), Kenyan middle- and long-distance runner
Lineth Chepkurui (born 1988), Kenyan long-distance runner
Lydiah Chepkurui (born 1984), Kenyan steeplechase runner and 2013 World Championships medallist

See also
Kipkirui, related name meaning "son of Kirui"

Kalenjin names
Surnames of Kenyan origin